This list is about AIK players with at least 100 league appearances. For a list of all AIK players with a Wikipedia article, see :Category:AIK Fotboll players. For the current AIK first-team squad, see First-team squad.

This is a list of AIK players with at least 100 league appearances.

Players
Matches of current players as of 7 March 2015.

References

 
Players
AIK Fotboll
Association football player non-biographical articles